The 2009 Internationaux de Strasbourg was a women's tennis tournament played on outdoor clay courts. It was the 23rd edition of the Internationaux de Strasbourg, and was part of the International-level tournaments of the 2009 WTA Tour. It took place at the Centre Sportif de Hautepierre in Strasbourg, France, from 18 May until 23 May 2009. Aravane Rezaï won the singles title.

Entrants

Seeds

 Seedings are based on the rankings of May 11, 2009.

Other entrants
The following players received wildcards into the main draw:

  Claire Feuerstein 
  Irena Pavlovic 
  Kinnie Laisne 

The following players received entry from the qualifying draw:

  Jasmin Wöhr
  Viktoriya Kutuzova
  Monica Niculescu
  Yulia Beygelzimer

Finals

Singles

 Aravane Rezaï defeated  Lucie Hradecká, 7–6(7–2), 6–1
It was Rezaï's first career title.

Doubles

 Nathalie Dechy /  Mara Santangelo defeated  Claire Feuerstein /  Stéphanie Foretz, 6–0, 6–1

External links
 Official website
 ITF tournament edition details 
 Tournament draws

Internationaux de Strasbourg
Internationaux de Strasbourg
Internationaux de Strasbourg
Internationaux de Strasbourg